The 1999 FIFA World Youth Championship took place in Nigeria between 3 and 24 April 1999. This was the 12th edition of the tournament.

Qualification 

The following 24 teams qualified for the 1999 FIFA World Youth Championship.

1.Teams that made their debut.

Venues

Squads

Group stage 

The 24 teams were split into six groups of four teams. Six group winners, six second-place finishers and the four best third-place finishers qualify for the knockout round.

Group A

Group B

Group C

Group D

Group E

Group F

Ranking of third-placed teams

Knockout stage

Bracket

Round of 16

Quarter-finals

Semi-finals

Third place play-off

Final

Result

Goalscorers 

5 goals
  Mahamadou Dissa
  Pablo Couñago

4 goals
  Gaspard Komol
  Peter Ofori-Quaye
  Mamadou Bagayoko
  Taylor Twellman
  Javier Chevantón

3 goals

  Fernando Baiano
  Edu
  Ronaldinho
  Enrico Kern
  Naohiro Takahara
  Roque Santa Cruz
  Gabri
  Fernando Varela

2 goals

  Francis Kioyo
  Zvonimir Deranja
  Baffour Gyan
  Damien Duff
  Richard Sadlier
  Shinji Ono
  Abdoulaye Camara
  Tenema Ndiaye
  Luis González
  Rafael Márquez
  Daniel Osorno
  Juan Pablo Rodríguez
  Hashimu Garba
  Ganiyu Shittu
  Simão
  Seol Ki-Hyeon
  José Barkero
  Xavi
  Bernard Makufi

1 goal

  Esteban Cambiasso
  Luciano Galletti
  Jason Culina
  John Maisano
  Mile Sterjovski
  Fábio Aurélio
  Rodrigo Gral
  Mancini
  Matuzalém
  Modeste M'bami
  Alberto Brenes
  Mauricio Garita
  Allan Meléndez
  Esteban Santana
  Ivica Banović
  Saša Bjelanović
  Darko Miladin
  Silvester Sabolčki
  Patrick Falk
  Christian Timm
  Tutu Adu
  Owusu Afriyie
  Julio César de León
  Carlos Oliva
  Maynor Suazo
  Garry Crossley
  Colin Healy
  Stephen McPhail
  Yasuhito Endō
  Tatsuya Ishikawa
  Masashi Motoyama
  Yuichiro Nagai
  Mitsuo Ogasawara
  Yerlan Urazayev
  Amadou Coulibaly
  Mahamadou Diarra
  Seydou Keita
  Eduardo Rodríguez
  Julius Aghahowa
  Pius Ikedia
  Nelson Cuevas
  Sergio Fernández
  Rubén Maldonado
  Nelson Vera
  Marco Claúdio
  Paulo Costa
  Ricardo Sousa
  Saleh Al-Saqri
  Mohamad Dabo
  Kim Kun-Hyung
  Lee Dong-Gook
  Na Hee-Keun
  Rubén Suárez
  Carlos Bocanegra
  Danny Califf
  Ryan Futagaki
  Jorge Anchen
  Fabián Canobbio
  Diego Forlán
  Japhet Makayi
  Ronald Mbambara
  Andrew Sinkala

Awards

Final ranking

External links 
 FIFA World Youth Championship Nigeria 1999 , FIFA.com
 RSSSF > FIFA World Youth Championship > 1999
 FIFA Technical Report (Part 1), (Part 2) and (Part 3)

Fifa World Youth Championship, 1999
Youth
FIFA World Youth Championship
International association football competitions hosted by Nigeria
April 1999 sports events in Africa